Zeno Ibsen Rossi (born 28 October 2000) is an English professional footballer who plays as a defender for EFL League One club Cambridge United.

Early life
Ibsen Rossi was born in Streatham, Greater London.

Career
Having spent time as a youngster with Brentford and Southampton, Ibsen Rossi then moved to AFC Bournemouth in 2017. At the end of the 2018–19 season, he signed his first professional contract.

On 15 July 2020, Ibsen Rossi joined Scottish Premiership club Kilmarnock on a season-long loan. He made his debut for the club on 29 August 2020, in a 4–0 home win against Dundee United.

On 31 July 2021, Ibsen Rossi made his competitive debut for AFC Bournemouth playing 90 minutes in the 5–0 home win against Milton Keynes Dons in EFL Cup. Ibsen Rossi was loaned to Dundee on 31 January 2022, although it took over a week for the deal to be confirmed by FIFA due to a "technical hitch". Ibsen Rossi would make his debut for Dundee in an away victory against Peterhead in the Scottish Cup. He would return to his parent club at the end of the season in May 2022.

On 18 July, Ibsen Rossi joined EFL League One club  Cambridge United.

Career statistics

References

External links

2000 births
Living people
Footballers from Streatham
English footballers
Association football defenders
Brentford F.C. players
Southampton F.C. players
AFC Bournemouth players
Kilmarnock F.C. players
Dundee F.C. players
Cambridge United F.C. players
English Football League players
Scottish Professional Football League players